Galletas de huevo, Spanish for "egg cookie", can refer to:

Galletas de huevo (Spanish cuisine), a soft cookie made from flour, sugar, butter, and eggs found in Latin America and Spain
Galletas de patatas, also called "egg cracklets", a crisp square-shaped biscuit from the Philippines